Bienenbüttel is a free municipality in the district of Uelzen, in Lower Saxony, Germany. Bienenbüttel is a part of the Hamburg Metropolitan Region and of the Lüneburg Heath.

Bienenbüttel is the seat of the Einheitsgemeinde ("free municipality") Bienenbüttel.
Incorporated into the municipality are the villages of Bargdorf, Beverbeck with Grünewald, Bornsen, Edendorf, Eitzen I with Bardenhagen, Grünhagen, Hohenbostel, Hohnstorf, Niendorf, Rieste with Neu-Rieste, Steddorf with Neu-Steddorf, Varendorf, Wichmannsburg and Wulfstorf.

References